Philip John Palethorpe (born 17 September 1986, in Wirral) is an English professional footballer who plays for Wirral Radio. He previously had two spells at Tranmere Rovers and made a professional appearance for Chester City.

Career

Palethorpe joined Chester from Tranmere early in 2006–07, having spent several years at Prenton Park without making a first–team appearance. He spent his first season with Chester as second–choice to ever–present goalkeeper John Danby, and then became third choice at the start of 2007–08 when Gavin Ward joined the club.

In November 2007, Palethorpe joined Tamworth in a two-month loan deal, allowing him to gain first–team experience in the Conference North. He returned to Chester two months later when Ward moved on to Wrexham and Palethorpe again became cover for Danby, finally making his Football League debut as a substitute when Danby was injured against Darlington on 22 March 2008. This proved to be his only appearance for the club, as he was released at the end of the season.

At the start of the following season, Palethorpe made a surprise return to Tranmere Rovers on a non-contract basis as emergency cover. By the end of August he had left and signed with Welsh club Airbus UK Broughton. He made 27 league appearances for the side before losing his place the following year to Kristian Rogers, eventually leading him to leave the club in January 2010 to sign for Cammell Laird.

Currently Phil is out of the football scene as he hurt his knee. He has partially retired from football but is keeping the door open in case a team comes along to sign him.

References

External links

1986 births
Living people
English footballers
Association football goalkeepers
Tranmere Rovers F.C. players
Chester City F.C. players
Tamworth F.C. players
Airbus UK Broughton F.C. players
Cammell Laird 1907 F.C. players
English Football League players
Cymru Premier players
Northern Premier League players
Sportspeople from Wirral
Footballers from Merseyside